Renaud du Bellay was the treasurer of Tours Cathedral and Archbishop of Reims from AD 1083 to 1096. He succeeded Manasses I after a vacancy of around three years. He presided over the Council of Soissons in 1092–93 which declared Roscellin's nominalism heretical. The acts of the council have not survived but it is known from contemporary correspondence, as with Anselm, the archbishop of Canterbury.

See also
Catholic Church in France

References

Citations

Bibliography
 .  &

Further reading
 Nouvelle Biographie Générale. Vol 33 Mal-Mar. Paris, 1859.

11th-century births
Archbishops of Reims
11th-century Roman Catholic archbishops in France
Year of death unknown